Caudiès-de-Fenouillèdes is a commune in the Pyrénées-Orientales department in southern France.

Geography

Localisation 
Caudiès-de-Fenouillèdes is located in the canton of La Vallée de l'Agly and in the arrondissement of Perpignan.

Toponymy 
The name of the town in Occitan is Caudiers de Fenolledès (historical form), de Fenolhedés (normalized form) or de Fenolhet (by similarity with other nearby communes).

The name first appears in 1011 as Caldarios. It is then written as Cauders in the 14th century, and then Caudies from the 15th to the 17th centuries, and then as Caudiers or Caudiès in modern Occitan.

In French, the official name is Caudiès in 1790, when the village becomes a commune, even though the names of Caudiès-de-Fenouillèdes or Caudiès-de-Saint-Paul were already in use. Caudiès-de-Saint-Paul is used until the end of the 19th century, but the town officially changes its name on 31 January 1898 to Caudiès-de-Fenouillèdes, still in use nowadays.

The name comes from the Latin caldarius, meaning cauldron, as can be seen on the local coat of arms, and may refer to  nearby pit caves around the river Boulzane.

Population

Sites of interest 
 The church of Our Lady of Laval.
 The ruins of the castle of Castel Fizel.
 The curious bridge of the Saint-Louis pass.

See also
Communes of the Pyrénées-Orientales department

References

Communes of Pyrénées-Orientales
Fenouillèdes